Washington High School Hockey is a co-ed sport, with teams divided into two leagues, the Western Washington High School Hockey League and the Tri-Cities High School Hockey League. Both leagues are divided into a division 1 and a division 2, and play through their own regular season. At the end of the season, the division 1 champions and the division 2 champions from each league play a single game championship against each other to determine the state champions in their respective divisions.

Western Washington High School Hockey League
The Western Washington High School Hockey League is made up of 12 teams (representing 20+ schools due to cooperative team arrangements) based west of the Cascade mountains. Currently, there are 5 teams in Division 1 and 7 teams in division 2.

Tri-Cities High School Hockey league
The Tri-Cities high School Hockey League is made up of teams east of the cascade mountains, and is currently maintained by the Tri-Cities Amateur Hockey Association.

External links
 Western Washington High school Hockey League
 Tri-Cities High School Hockey League

High school ice hockey in the United States
Ice hockey in Washington (state)
Ice hockey teams in Washington (state)